The Huludao City Sports Centre Stadium is a stadium in Huludao, China, with a capacity of 32,000.

References

Football venues in China